Tellef Øgrim (born 27 January 1958) is a Norwegian fretless guitarist, composer and journalist.

He played in oboist Jan Wiese's band Bitihorn from 1976  and joined Ole Hedemann's Ung Pike Forsunnet (UPF) in 1981. UPF released two albums. In 1985 Øgrim and vocalist Anne Danielsen (later his wife) formed the soul-rock band Duck Spin, releasing the group's only album Wake me when the Moon gets up the year after. In 1987 Øgrim released the jazz-rock album Libido (Hot Club Records) with Henrik Hellstenius (keyb), Tore Eide (bs/cl) and Inge Norum (dr/prc).

During the same period of time he wrote music for two theater plays staged by Piotr Cholodzinski.

In 2004 Øgrim released a CD containing improvisations for fretless electric guitar under the title Some Dodos Never Die and in 2007 the CD Wagon 8| was released on Curling Legs Records with Polish drummer Jacek Kochan, trombonist Dag Einar Eilertsen, Henrik Hellstenius (laptop) (one track) and singer Anne Danielsen (one track).

In 2008 Øgrim played on the free jazz CD Do I the In? (Not Two Records) where he played with Joe Fonda (bs), Jacek Kochan (dr) and Franz Hautzinger (trp). In 2010 he formed the music-live-video project Mugetuft  with Peter Knudsen and Henrik Hellstenius and an improvisational trio with cello player Clementine Gasser and Jacek Kochan. This trio's first album was released by Not Two Records.

Since 2014 Øgrim has cooperated with Swedish bassist Anders Berg on several duo albums. Berg and Øgrim have gone on to create the record label Simlas that also has released Øgrim's latest solo album called Fat Fit - Solos for Guitars. In January 2017 Øgrim went on to form a free jazz trio with Peeter Uuskyla and Anders Berg by releasing the album Ullr.

Øgrim has been a journalist since the late 1980s writing for the Norwegian Broadcasting Corporation (NRK), Dagens Naeringsliv, Ballade and Oslo Business Memo, and Oslo Innovation Magazine and Blue Frontier Magazine. He also is a speaker on topics relating to art and technology.

References

External links
Official website

Norwegian guitarists
Norwegian male guitarists
Norwegian composers
Norwegian male composers
1958 births
Living people
Musicians from Oslo